The Montreal Lake Cree Nation is a Woodland Cree First Nation in northern Saskatchewan. The administrative centre of the Montreal Lake Cree Nation is located in the community of Montreal Lake.

Band government
The village is the administrative centre of the Montreal Lake First Nations band government. Chief William Charles and his councillors signed an adhesion to Treaty 6 in 1889 on behalf of Montreal Lake First Nation. and is a member of the Prince Albert Grand Council.

As of March 2013 the total membership of the Montreal Lake First Nation was 3,678 with 2,261 members living on-reserve or on crown land and 1,417 living off reserve. It is governed by a Chief and 8 councillors. It has territory at Montreal Lake 106 (population 999), Montreal Lake 106 B (population 389) and Timber Bay (population 93).

Demographics

References

First Nations in Saskatchewan
Unincorporated communities in Saskatchewan